Zieria inexpectata is a plant in the citrus family Rutaceae and endemic to south-eastern Queensland. It is a small, compact shrub with erect, wiry branches, three-part leaves and groups of up to twelve white flowers, the groups longer than the leaves and the flowers with four petals and four stamens. It was unexpectedly discovered by the authors during a field trip and its discovery led to a paper describing the zierias of Queensland, including sixteen new species.

Description
The leaves are composed of three narrow elliptic to narrow lance-shaped leaflets with the narrower end towards the base. Both sides of the leaflets are slightly hairy.

Taxonomy and naming
Zieria inexpectata was first formally described in 2007 by Marco Duretto and Paul Forster from a specimen collected near Gayndah and the description was published in Austrobaileya. The specific epithet (inexpectata) refers to the unexpected discovery of this species whilst the authors were studying an undescribed species of Boronia on a field trip. The discovery lead to a paper on the zierias of Queensland, including sixteen new species.

Distribution and habitat
This zieria grows in sandy soil in woodland in south-east Queensland, including the central Burnett district, and near Proston and Wondai.

Conservation
Zieria inexpectata is classed as "endangered" under the Queensland Nature Conservation Act 1992.

References

inexpectata
Sapindales of Australia
Flora of Queensland
Taxa named by Marco Duretto
Plants described in 2007
Taxa named by Paul Irwin Forster